Tiffany Granath is an American actress and satellite radio personality.

Career
Following graduation from high school, Granath moved to Los Angeles, California to pursue a career in dance and wound up touring with both The Beach Boys and Bette Midler. Tiffany subsequently went on to act in a handful of films and TV shows as well as appear in assorted Playboy videos. Granath was the former host of the Tiffany Granath Show on Playboy Radio. The show was abruptly cancelled in 2013.

Tiffany can now be heard via Mobile App Spreaker live Mondays and Wednesdays 11am west 2pm east. Fridays the show broadcasts via the web from California at the TradioV studios along with producers Marie "The Dirt" Lanza and Barry Funkhouser.

Replays of the show may be heard anytime on iHeartRadio.

External links
 Tiffany Granath's official website
 Tiffany on Twitter
 Spreaker Mobile app
 Tiffany Granath's MySpace Place
 

American radio personalities
Actresses from Kentucky
Living people
Radio personalities from Kentucky
1968 births
21st-century American women